The Stone Mushrooms are a rock phenomenon near Beli plast village in Bulgaria, on the road between Haskovo and Kardzhali. They are about 2.5 metres tall. The  area was declared to be a natural resource on 13 May 1974, according to №РД-552 bill of the Ministry of Environment and Water. Interesting kinds of birds can be observed in the area: short-toed eagle, Egyptian vulture, red-rumped swallow, eastern black-eared wheatear, etc.

Gallery

External links

 The Stone Mushrooms (in Bulgarian)

Rock formations of Bulgaria
Landforms of Kardzhali Province